1950 in philosophy

Events 
 Bertrand Russell was awarded the 1950 Nobel Prize in Literature "in recognition of his varied and significant writings in which he champions humanitarian ideals and freedom of thought".

Publications 
 Martin Heidegger, Off the Beaten Track including the essay The Origin of the Work of Art (originally published in German as Holzwege in 1950)
 Norbert Wiener, The Human Use of Human Beings (1950)
 Ernst Gombrich, The Story of Art (1950)
 Alan Turing, Computing Machinery and Intelligence (1950)

Births 
 September 9 - Seyla Benhabib

Deaths 
 February 2 - Constantin Carathéodory (born 1873)
 March 1 - Alfred Korzybski (born 1879)
 September 6 - Olaf Stapledon (born 1886)
 October 9 - Nicolai Hartmann (born 1882)

References 

Philosophy
20th-century philosophy
Philosophy by year